Bachelor of International Development, also known as Bachelor of Science in International Development, is a multidisciplinary degree in the branch of social science. Students study Development studies and several of its disciplines. The qualification is offered by a handful of universities globally. The degree connects different approaches to development and addresses real-world problems relating to economic growth, politics, humanitarianism, poverty, environment and governance in poorer countries. Students of International Development studies often choose careers in international organisations such as the United Nations or the World Bank, non-governmental organisations, private sector development consultancy firms, and research centers. Students develop skills in programme planning, research methods, statistics, food policy, and other areas which will equip them to work effectively in organisations at home or overseas addressing such challenges.

External links
BSc International Development- London School of Economics and Political Science
BSc International Development University of Reading
BSc International Development and the Environment University of East Anglia
BSc Environment and Development The London School of Economics and Political Science is a School of the University of London
International Development & Food Policy BSc (Hons) University College Cork
BSc International Environment & Development Studies Norwegian University of Life Sciences
BA International Development- University Of Leeds
BA International Development University Of Sussex
BA International Development University of Essex
BA International Development University of Portsmouth

International Development